Stefan Jacobsson (born 26 December 1947) is a Swedish weightlifter. He competed in the men's light heavyweight event at the 1976 Summer Olympics.

References

External links
 

1947 births
Living people
Swedish male weightlifters
Olympic weightlifters of Sweden
Weightlifters at the 1976 Summer Olympics
Sportspeople from Västerbotten County
20th-century Swedish people